The 2013–14 Eastern Counties Football League season (known as the 2013–14 Thurlow Nunn Eastern Counties Football League for sponsorship reasons) was the 72nd in the history of Eastern Counties Football League a football competition in England. The season started on 10 August 2013 and finished on 26 April 2014.

Premier Division

The Premier Division featured 18 clubs which competed in the division last season, along with two new clubs, promoted from the Division One:
Brightlingsea Regent
Newmarket Town

Hadleigh United and Felixstowe & Walton United did not apply for promotion. Gorleston and Godmanchester Rovers applied for promotion but then withdrew from the process. Brightlingsea Regent have applied for promotion and met the ground grading, but will only be promoted if they finish in the top three. Cambridge Regional College resigned and later folded at the end of the season.

League table

Results

Division One

Division One featured 15 clubs which competed in the division last season, along with four new clubs:
Haverhill Borough, promoted from Essex and Suffolk Border Football League
A.F.C. Sudbury reserves
Dereham Town reserves
Needham Market reserves

League table

Results

References

External links
 Eastern Counties Football League

2013-14
9